MIT Robocon Tech Team is a group of engineering students of Maharashtra Institute of Technology, Pune. They work systematically for a year before the Robocon India competition. MIT Tech Team has represented India four times at the international ABU Robocon, in 2008, 2010, 2012 and 2013. The MIT Tech Team is known for its consistent performance by being at least semi-finalist nine times in ten years.

History

Runners-up of Robocon India 2008 

The theme for Robocon 2008 chosen by India was Govinda, a traditional Indian deity who used to play earthly games by capturing butter/cheese from the heads of Gopis. It was won by Institute of Technology, Nirma University. MIT Tech Team was runner-up. Both teams represented India in ABU Robocon as the host country is represented by two teams.

National Winner of Robocon India 2010 

The theme for Robocon 2010 chosen by Egypt was Robo-Pharaohs Build Pyramids. It was won by MIT Tech Team.

National Winner of Robocon India 2012 
The theme for Robocon 2012 chosen by Hong Kong, "Peng On Dai Gat". It was won by MIT Tech Team.

National Winner of Robocon India 2013 
The theme for Robocon 2013 chosen by Vietnam was "The Green Planet". It was won by MIT Tech Team.

References

External links 

 Robocon India
 MIT Tech Team
 Official site
 Robocon 2009 Tokyo
 Robocon 2010 Egypt
 Robocon 2011 Thailand
 Robocon 2012 Hong Kong

Robotics competitions
Recurring events established in 2002
2002 establishments in Maharashtra